Nelson Leigh (born Sydney Talbot Christie; January 1, 1905 – July 3, 1985) was an American motion picture actor of the 1940s and 1950s.

Early years
Born in Mississippi, Leigh was the son of Mr. and Mrs. Harry Christie. He was a graduate of the University of Southern California, class of 1929.

Career
Leigh appeared on Broadway in Hamlet (1945).

Leigh made over 130 appearances in motion pictures of the 1940s and 1950s, mainly in supporting roles. On stage, Leigh portrayed Jesus Christ for many years in the annual production of the Pilgrimage Play in the Hollywood Pilgrimage Bowl. This typecast Nelson Leigh in religious and medieval roles; in 1949 he played King Arthur in the adventure serial The Adventures of Sir Galahad. That same year he appeared in an early syndicated television film, a notoriously low-budgeted half-hour adaptation of Charles Dickens's A Christmas Carol with Vincent Price as narrator and Taylor Holmes as Ebenezer Scrooge (and the young Jill St. John as one of Bob Cratchit's daughters); Leigh played the Ghost of Christmas Past. He played Jesus Christ in a Christian film The Living Bible, and the Apostle Paul in the "Life of St. Paul" series and again in the "Acts of the Apostles" series. He played priests in various films, including Angels' Alley (1947) with The Bowery Boys, and the western Jesse James vs. the Daltons (1954). He made regular appearances in the Christian television anthology series, This Is the Life, in the recurring role of Pastor Martin. He also appeared in costume dramas; 

His calm demeanor often landed him roles as military officers and other authority figures. He appeared in the cult science-fiction movie World Without End as Dr. Gailbraithe. Later in his career he appeared mainly on television, such as in a 1950 episode (#21) of the TV series The Lone Ranger, the 1955 anthology series Police Call  and in popular TV shows such as Perry Mason (often seen as a judge). Bonanza, and The F.B.I.

Recognition
In 1949, the American Association of Religious Film Directors gave Leigh its Best Actor Award for his portrayal of the Christus in The Calling of Matthew. In 1953 he won a "Christian Oscar" from the National Evangelistic Film Foundation for his work in two series, The Living Bible and  This Is the Life.

Selected filmography

 Appointment in Berlin (1943) - Civilian (uncredited)
 First Comes Courage (1943) - Blake (uncredited)
 The Man from Down Under (1943) - Man in Sydney Pub (uncredited)
 Sahara (1943) - British Soldier (uncredited)
 Corvette K-225 (1943) - Naval Officer (uncredited)
 Lassie Come Home (1943) - Joe's Teacher (uncredited)
 The Return of the Vampire (1943) - Sir Frederick's Office Assistant (uncredited)
 A Guy Named Joe (1943) - Man (uncredited)
 What a Woman! (1943) - Reporter (uncredited)
 Texas Masquerade (1944) - James Corwin
 Two-Man Submarine (1944) - Naval Officer (uncredited)
 Jam Session (1944) - Vincent Blake (uncredited)
 The Girl in the Case (1944) - Fred (uncredited)
 Follow the Boys (1944) - Bull Fiddler (uncredited)
 The White Cliffs of Dover (1944) - British Naval Officer (uncredited)
 Louisiana Hayride (1944) - Wiffle - Makeup Artist
 Mr. Winkle Goes to War (1944) - Army Doctor (uncredited)
 U-Boat Prisoner (1944) - Destroyer Lt. Hagen (uncredited)
 Meet Miss Bobby Socks (1944) - Henry Bricker (uncredited)
 Tonight and Every Night (1945) - British Army Officer (uncredited)
 It's a Pleasure (1945) - Waiter (scenes deleted)
 Identity Unknown (1945) - Col. F.A. Marlin
 Son of Lassie (1945) - Flight Coordinator (uncredited)
 Cornered (1945) - Dominion Official (uncredited)
 The Sailor Takes a Wife (1945) - Canadian Officer (uncredited)
 The Bandit of Sherwood Forest (1946) - Robin Hood's Man (uncredited)
 Brick Bradford (1947, Serial) - Edward Preston (uncredited)
 Angels' Alley (1948) - Father O'Hanlon
 The Black Arrow (1948) - Guard (uncredited)
 Superman (1948, Serial) - Jor-El (uncredited)
 The Gallant Blade (1948) - D'Emery (uncredited)
 Congo Bill (1948, Serial) - Dr. Greenway
 Racing Luck (1948) - Hendricks
 The Fighting O'Flynn (1949) - Officer (uncredited)
 The Lost Tribe (1949) - Zoron
 Barbary Pirate (1949) - Rindeff
 Jolson Sings Again (1949) - Theater Manager (uncredited)
 Adventures of Sir Galahad (1949, Serial) - King Arthur
 The Pilgrimage Play (1949) - Jesus of Nazareth
 Life of St. Paul Series (1949) - St. Paul
 Captive Girl (1950) - Reverend E.R. Holcom (uncredited)
 Rogues of Sherwood Forest (1950) - Baron Benedict (uncredited)
 Home Town Story (1951) - Dr. Johnson
 Yukon Manhunt (1951) - Jim Kenmore
 Hurricane Island (1951) - Padre
 Submarine Command (1951) - Gen. Whitehead (uncredited)
 Bugles in the Afternoon (1952) - Maj. Reno (uncredited)
 Thief of Damascus (1952) - Ben Jammal
 Magnificent Adventure (1952)
 Savage Mutiny (1953) - Dr. Parker
 Split Second (1953) - Scientist at Control Station (uncredited)
 Valley of Head Hunters (1953) - Mr. Bradley
 The Great Adventures of Captain Kidd (1953, Serial) - Robert Langdon [Chs. 1-3, 13-15] (uncredited)
 Prisoners of the Casbah (1953) - Emir (uncredited)
 Jack Slade (1953) - Alf Slade
 Texas Bad Man (1953) - Bradley
 Jesse James vs. the Daltons (1954) - Father Kerrigan
 Drums of Tahiti (1954) - Minister (uncredited)
 The Saracen Blade (1954) - Isaac
 The Black Shield of Falworth (1954) - Archbishop at Myles' Knighting (uncredited)
 The Outlaw's Daughter (1954) - Jim Dalton
 Big House, U.S.A. (1955) - Madden's FBI Supervisor (uncredited)
 The Virgin Queen (1955) - Physician (uncredited)
 Creature with the Atom Brain (1955) - Dr. Kenneth C. Norton (uncredited)
 Rebel Without a Cause (1955) - Desk Sergeant #1 (uncredited)
 World Without End (1956) - Dr. Eldon Galbraithe
 The First Texan (1956) - Col. Hockley
 Hold Back the Night (1956) - Lt. Col. Toomey
 Strange Intruder (1956) - Doctor (uncredited)
 Toward the Unknown (1956) - Chaplain (uncredited)
 Friendly Persuasion (1956) - Methodist Minister (uncredited)
 Untamed Mistress (1956) - The Holy Man
 The Spirit of St. Louis (1957) - Director (uncredited)
 Gunfight at the O.K. Corral (1957) - Mayor Kelly
 God Is My Partner (1957) - Rev. William Goodwin
 Jet Pilot (1957) - FBI Agent (uncredited)
 The Unholy Wife (1957) - Metallurgy Expert (uncredited)
 Bombers B-52 (1957) - Brig. Gen. Wayne Acton
 Official Detective (1957, Episode: "Tinseled Alibi") - Cozco
 The Book of Acts Series (1957) - Apostle Paul / Saul of Tarsus
 The Naked and the Dead (1958) - Admiral (uncredited)
 Voice in the Mirror (1958) - Dr. Bernhardt (uncredited)
 Step Down to Terror (1958) - Reverend Johnson
 In Love and War (1958) - Lt. Col. Herron (uncredited)
 The Hangman (1959) - Col. Hammond (uncredited)
 Imitation of Life (1959) - Doctor (uncredited)
 These Thousand Hills (1959) - Brother Van (uncredited)
 Operation Petticoat (1959) - Adm. Koenig (uncredited)
 Vice Raid (1959) - Louise's Attending Physician (uncredited)
 Ma Barker's Killer Brood (1960) - George Barker
 The Gallant Hours (1960) - Adm. Dan Callaghan (uncredited)
 Ocean's 11 (1960) - Doctor / Specialist (uncredited)
 The Dark at the Top of the Stairs (1960) - Ed Peabody (uncredited)
 A Fever in the Blood (1961) - Doctor (uncredited)
 The Little Shepherd of Kingdom Come (1961) - Mr. Turner
 Lover Come Back (1961) - Northcross, Ad Council Chairman (uncredited)
 The Outsider (1961) - Judge (uncredited)
 Incident in an Alley (1962) - Police Commissioner Bell (uncredited)
 A Gathering of Eagles (1963) - Gen. Aymes
 The Silencers (1966) - Tung-Tze Agent (uncredited)
 The Nickel Ride (1974) - (uncredited) (final film role)

References

External links
 

1905 births
1985 deaths
American male film actors
University of Southern California alumni
20th-century American male actors